Enarmonia formosana, the cherrybark tortrix or cherry-bark moth, is a small but colorful moth species of the family Tortricidae. It is native to all of northern and western Europe, ranging south to the Maghreb. North of the Alps its range extends eastwards to Siberia and Kazakhstan. Possibly and most likely introduced populations are found in Asia Minor and North America, respectively.

It is the type species of its genus (Enarmonia), and by extension of the tribe Enarmoniini of subfamily Olethreutinae.

The wingspan is 15–19 mm. The forewings have a moderately arched costa.The ground colour is ferruginous-ochreous, with leaden metallic striae. The costa is blackish, posteriorly strigulated with white. The basal patch has the edge sharply angulated in the middle and indented near dorsum> The central fascia is interrupted in the middle dark fuscous, marked with ferruginous-ochreous. The ocellus is black, edged with leaden-metallic and streaked with ferruginous, surmounted by a dark fuscous curved mark.The hindwings are rather dark fuscous.The larva is rosy - whitish.

The adult moths fly from May to October in the temperate parts of the range (e.g. Belgium and the Netherlands).

The caterpillars feed on the bark of woody Rosaceae of subfamily Amygdaloideae, namely hawthorns (Crataegus), apples (Malus), cherries (Prunus) and pears (Pyrus). In particular, they have been noted to forage at canker lesions. They prefer mature trees.

The larvae produce a reddish frass at the entrance to their tunnel. Signs of larval feeding can be seen at cracks in the bark, or at joints with branches. The larva pupates at the entrance to its tunnel, often enclosed by frass secured with silk.

Synonyms
Junior synonyms of this species are:
 Laspeyresia woeberiana (Denis & Schiffermüller, 1775)
 Phalaena formosana Scopoli, 1763
 Pyralis woeberana Fabricius, 1787
 Tortrix ornatana Hübner, [1796-1799]
 Tortrix scriptana Thunberg & Borgström, 1784
 Tortrix woeberiana Denis & Schiffermüller, 1775

Footnotes

References
 Baixeras, J.; Brown, J. W. & Gilligan, T. M. (2009a): Online World Catalogue of the Tortricidae – genus Olethreutes account. Version 1.3.1. Retrieved 2009-JAN-20.
 Baixeras, J.; Brown, J. W. & Gilligan, T. M. (2009b): Online World Catalogue of the Tortricidae – Enarmonia formosana. Version 1.3.1. Retrieved 2010-APR-19.
 Grabe, Albert (1942): Eigenartige Geschmacksrichtungen bei Kleinschmetterlingsraupen ["Strange tastes among micromoth caterpillars"]. Zeitschrift des Wiener Entomologen-Vereins 27: 105-109 [in German]. PDF fulltext

External links

 waarneming.nl 
 Lepidoptera of Belgium
 Cherry-bark Moth at UKmoths
 Eurasian Tortricidae

Olethreutinae
Moths described in 1763
Moths of Asia
Tortricidae of Europe
Moths of North America
Taxa named by Giovanni Antonio Scopoli